The following is a list of episodes from the series Nella the Princess Knight.

Series overview

Episodes

Season 1 (2017–18)

Season 2 (2018–21)

Notes

References

Lists of American children's animated television series episodes
Lists of Nickelodeon television series episodes